Björn Roger Gedda (born 3 March 1942 in Solna, but grew up in Boden) is a Swedish actor. He was a stepfather to actress Johanna Sällström.

Selected filmography 

1977 – Den allvarsamma leken
1980 – Mannen som blev miljonär
1981 – Gräset sjunger
1986 – The Brothers Mozart
1986 – Bödeln och skökan
1986–present – Hassel (as Simon Palm)
1989 – Tre kärlekar (TV)
1989 - Peter och Petra 
1990 – Den svarta cirkeln (TV)
1997 – Snoken (TV)
1998 – Beck – Monstret
1999 – Sjön
2006 – Exit
2006 – Kronprinsessan (TV)
2009 – Superhjältejul (TV, Julkalendern)

References

External links 

 
 

Swedish male film actors
Living people
1942 births
People from Solna Municipality
People from Boden Municipality
Swedish male television actors
20th-century Swedish male actors
21st-century Swedish male actors